Combat: Task Force 121, known in Europe as America's Secret Operations, is a first-person shooter developed by Direct Action Games for Microsoft Windows and Xbox in 2005.

Reception

The game received "unfavorable" reviews on both platforms according to the review aggregation website Metacritic.

References

External links
 

2005 video games
First-person shooters
Groove Games games
Multiplayer and single-player video games
Video games developed in the United States
Windows games
Xbox games